Zhong can refer to
 Zhong (surname), pinyin romanization of Chinese surnames including 钟, 种, 仲, etc.
 Zhong County, a county of Chongqing, China
 Zhongjian River, a river in Hubei, China
 Bianzhong, a Chinese musical instrument similar to a bell
 Cha zhong, a 3-piece tea brewing vessel, also known as a gaiwan.
 The Mean 中, concept of Chinese philosophy (see Doctrine of the Mean)
 Loyalty :zh:忠, one of the precepts in Confucianism.

See also
 Chong (disambiguation)